Carlile may refer to:

 Carlile (given name)
 Carlile (surname)
 Carlile baronets
Carlile Shale, a geologic formation in the central-western United States
Carlile Transportation, a transportation company based in Anchorage, Alaska, U.S.

See also
 Carlisle (disambiguation)